The 2004 Ballon d'Or, given to the best football player in Europe as judged by a panel of sports journalists from UEFA member countries, was delivered to the Ukrainian striker Andriy Shevchenko on 13 December 2004. On 9 November 2004, was announced the shortlist of 50 male players compiled by a group of experts from France Football. There were 52 voters, from Albania, Andorra, Armenia, Austria, Azerbaijan, Belarus, Belgium, Bosnia-Herzegovina, Bulgaria, Croatia, Cyprus, Czech Republic, Denmark, England, Estonia, Faroe Islands, Finland, France, Georgia, Germany, Greece, Hungary, Iceland, Israel, Italy, Kazakhstan, Latvia, Liechtenstein, Lithuania, Luxembourg, Macedonia, Malta, Moldova, Netherlands, Northern Ireland, Norway, Poland, Portugal, Republic of Ireland, Romania, Russia, San Marino, Scotland, Slovakia, Slovenia, Spain, Sweden, Switzerland, Turkey, Ukraine, Wales and Yugoslavia. Each picked a first (5pts), second (4pts), third (3pts), fourth (2pts) and  fifth choice (1pt).

Andriy Shevchenko was the third Ukrainian to win the award after Oleh Blokhin (1975) and Igor Belanov (1986). He finished top goalscorer in the 2003–04 Serie A, scoring 24 goals in 32 matches, as his team won the league title. The best ranked goalkeeper on the list was Gianluigi Buffon (Italy) with a 17th place (jointly with Traianos Dellas, Fernando Morientes, Frank Lampard and Didier Drogba). Ricardo Carvalho (Portugal) was the top ranked defender in the list, at ninth, while Deco (Portugal) was the top ranked midfielder at second place.

Rankings

Voted players

Non-voted players
The following 21 men were originally in contention for the 2004 Ballon d’Or, but did not receive any votes:

References

External links
 France Football Official website
 Rec.Sport.Soccer Statistics Foundation - "Ballon d'Or" 2004 voting results

2004
2004–05 in European football